Susan Kolb (born November 26, 1954) is a medical doctor in Atlanta, Georgia and the author of The Naked Truth about Breast Impants: From Harm to Healing. Kolb's medical practice combines conventional, holistic and integrative medicine with spiritual healing.  Her area of specialization is plastic and reconstructive surgery. Kolb is a medical authority on the complications arising from breast implants, and has been an active voice in the debate about the safety of breast implant devices since 1996.  She has treated over 2,000 women suffering from breast implant disease and related systemic immune disorders.

Biography

Susan Kolb was born on November 26, 1954, in Havre de Grace, Maryland.  She grew up with her parents, Doris and Gene Kolb, and an older brother, Charles Kolb.  As a child, she gravitated toward medicine, reading books on biology and genetics while still in grade school. She graduated from Lawrence High School in 1972 and attended Johns Hopkins University where she studied premedicine and graduated with honors in 1975.  In order to continue her studies in medicine, she joined the U. S. Air Force Reserves.  She attended Washington University School of Medicine and graduated in 1979 at the age of 24.  She was accepted at the University of Virginia for a surgical residency, but was called into service by the Air Force before her residency at UVA began.  The Air Force sent her to Wilford Hall Medical Center, a 1,000-bed Air Force hospital at Lackland Air Force Base in San Antonio, TX.  She completed on a three-year course of general surgery, followed by a plastic surgery residency. She served as the Chief of Plastic Surgery at Wright Patterson Air Force Base from 1984-88.  During her time in the Air Force, she performed scar revisions, breast reductions, cosmetic surgeries, burn surgeries, hand surgeries, breast reconstructions, and body contouring surgeries. She established a craniofacial board that helped manage children with facial deformities.  She helped plan the surgical hospitals that would be later used in Desert Storm, especially as they pertained to burn care.

She left the Air Force 1988 as a Major and moved to Atlanta, Georgia.  She joined a private medical practice in plastic surgery where she practiced for two years.  In 1990, she left her medical practice for six months to study spiritual medicine. When she returned to medicine, she incorporated holistic treatment methods.  In 1995, she established Plastikos Surgery Center, where she incorporated several disciplines of holistic medicine including energy medicine, vibrational medicine and spiritual healing.  In 1998, she founded Millennium Healthcare to address a broader range of medical conditions. In 1999, she established Avatar Cancer Center to treat cancer and serious viral illnesses with integrative techniques.

Breast implant controversy

In the 1990s, hundreds of thousands of women filed claims in lawsuits against breast implant manufacturing companies, asserting that they had been injured from silicone breast implants. Juries awarded a series of multimillion-dollar settlements to women with symptoms of systemic immune disorder, connective tissue diseases or neurological disorders. A class action settlement of $4.25 billion, the largest in U.S. history, resulted in Dow Corning filing for bankruptcy.

In 1996, Kolb wrote "Doctor, Are You Listening?", an article outlining the symptoms of silicone implant disease. The article was published on various Internet sites, and her practice became known to women seeking treatment for silicone-related conditions. Many women complained that their health concerns were often dismissed or denied by the other doctors. In 2010, she documented her treatment of women with breast implant disease in her book The Naked Truth about Implants: From Harm to Healing.  The book includes a detailed history of the implant controversy and a review of the major research into complications of breast implants. Dr. Douglas Shanklin, Emeritus Professor of Pathology, Laboratory Medicine, and Obstetrics and Gynecology, who along with Dr. David L. Smalley, published most of the pertinent research in silicone biochemistry, wrote the foreword. The book outlines Kolb's treatment protocols and includes stories contributed by seven of her patients, as well as her own.

Kolb has been interviewed about her experience treating breast implant problems including chemical and biotoxicity on the Today Show with Katie Couric, Holistic Health Show with Dr. Carl Helvie, and Inside Cosmetic Surgery Today with Barry Lycka. She has been interviewed for articles about breast implants in Glamour Magazine, People Magazine, and in Vanity Insanity, a Canadian television documentary She also appears as a medical expert on three episodes of Animal Planet's Monsters Inside Me (episodes "Something's Eating My Son Inside Out," "Vampire Parasites Attack," and "I Have a WHAT in My WHAT?"); in all three of her appearances, she treats a woman whose breast implants have been contaminated with aspergillus fungi.

Integrative medicine

She has lectured and published articles on other topics, including 21st century medicine, spiritual medicine, environmental toxicity and the benefits of integrating science and spirituality in the practice of medical healing.  Kolb is also the author of "The Spiritual Healer and Synthesis Medicine," a chapter in Goddess Shift: Women Leading for a Change, an anthology of the writings over forty women leaders. In 2011, Kolb wrote "Energy Management: A Blueprint for Optimism," which was published as a chapter in Optimism! Cultivating the Magic Quality that Can Extend Your Lifespan, Boost Your Energy ad make You Happy Now by Dawson Church and Stephanie Marohn.  Kolb has hosted the monthly Atlanta Community Group for Noetic Science since 1996. Noetic Science, founded by astronaut Edgar Mitchell, is an organization dedicated to the study of extended human capability, integral health and healing, and emerging world views.

Weekly radio show

Since 1998, Kolb has hosted a weekly radio show, The Temple of Health, on BBS Radio. The show is broadcast live between 12:00 – 1:00 pm EST each Saturday. Through interviews with authors, physicians, medical researchers and holistic practitioners, Kolb introduces a variety of medical topics related to traditional and holistic medicine, spiritual growth and fulfillment, scientific breakthroughs and various medical disorders. Her guests have included Dr. Bernie Seigel, Greg Braden, Dr. Andrew Weil and Dr. Amit Goswami.

Publications

 The Naked Truth about Breast Implants: From Harm to Healing (2010)
"The Spiritual Healer and Synthesis Medicine," in Goddess Shift: Women Leading for a Change by Stephanie Marohn. 
"Energy Management: A Blueprint for Optimism," in Optimism! Cultivating the Magic Quality That Can Extend Your Lifespan, Boost Your Energy and Make You Happy Now by Dawson Church and Stephanie Marohn.
"Silicone Immune Treatment Protocol"
"Doctor, Are You Listening? 
"Merging Traditional and Alternative Medicine." 
Holistic Medicine 
"Integrative Team Approach To Breast Carcinoma."
"Twenty-First Century Healthcare: The Integrated Medical Center."   
"Spiritual Medicine."  
Contributions in Plastic Surgery Tales: A Look behind the Face of the Specialty (2004), by Robert Cooper.
"Life After Breast Implants" Explant Info: Lynne Hayes (2012) Kolb contributed a condensed version of her story ― The Naked Truth About Breast Implants to "Life After Breast Implants"

Criticism

Kolb's position on breast implant disease and the severity of complications arising from breast implant disease is controversial within the medical establishment. While earlier research studies suggested that certain autoimmune conditions may be related to breast implants, later research resulted in no conclusive epidemiological connection. Many plastic surgeons do not believe that these conditions exist and their position is supported by the American Association of Plastic Surgeons and the United States Food and Drug Administration. After removing silicone breast implants from the market (except in restricted circumstances) in 1992, the FDA re-approved them for consumer sales in 2006 as the result of later research. Kolb has questioned the wisdom of this move and has suggested that corporate interests have taken precedence over public health. She asserts that more recent research studies are flawed for several reasons: the elevation of epidemiological evidence over other traditional methods of diagnosis, such as clinical observation and pathology; breast implant manufacturers and plastic surgeons played a major role in designing and conducting the research; and the studies were conducted over a three to five-year period. Kolb associates the onset of symptoms of breast implant disease with the breakdown of the implants' elastomer shell which contains the silicone gel, which typically occurs between eight and twelve years after implantation.

References 

People from Havre de Grace, Maryland
1954 births
People from Atlanta
American plastic surgeons
Johns Hopkins University alumni
Living people
Washington University School of Medicine alumni
Writers from Georgia (U.S. state)
Women surgeons